The 93d Bombardment Wing is an inactive United States Air Force unit. Its last assignment was with the Second Air Force, based at Sioux Falls Army Air Field, South Dakota. It was inactivated on 28 August 1945.

The wing was a command and control organization for Eighth Air Force.  It had no groups until April 1944. Flew in combat in the European theater from 2  June until 14 August 1944 when its groups were reassigned.    Programmed to become B-29 Superfortress Wing in the Pacific Theater, but inactivated before becoming operational.

History

Lineage
 Constituted as 93d Bombardment Wing (Heavy) on 25 October 1943
 Activated on 1 November 1943
 Redesignated 93d Combat Bombardment Wing (Heavy) in August 1943
 Disbanded on 28 August 1945.

Assignments
 VIII Bomber Command, 1 November 1943
 2d Bombardment (later, 3d Air) Division, 22 February 1944 – 18 June 1945
 Second Air Force, c. 27 July-28 August 1945

Units assigned
 34th Bombardment Group: April 1944-18 June 1945
 385th Bombardment Group: 1 January-4 August 1945
 490th Bombardment Group: 1 January 1945 – 24 August 1945
 493d Bombardment Group: April 1944-6 August 1945

Stations
 RAF Horsham St Faith, England, November 1943
 Elveden Hall, England, c. 10 January 1944
 Mendlesham Hall, England, c. 30 March 1944 – 11 July 1945
 Sioux Falls Army Air Field, South Dakota, C. 27 July-28 August 1945.

References

 Maurer, Maurer (1983). Air Force Combat Units Of World War II. Maxwell AFB, Alabama: Office of Air Force History. .

093
Military units and formations established in 1943
Military units and formations disestablished in 1945